The 2006 BP Ultimate Masters of Formula 3 was the sixteenth Masters of Formula 3 race held at Circuit Park Zandvoort on 6 August 2006. It was won by Paul di Resta, for ASM Formule 3.

Drivers and teams

Classification

Race

See also
 2006 Formula 3 Euro Series season
 2006 British Formula 3 season

References

External links
 2006 BP Ultimate Masters Schedule

Masters of Formula Three
Masters of Formula Three
Masters
Masters of Formula Three